Walter Christensen may refer to:

John Walther Christensen ("Walther Christensen") (1918 – 1965), Danish amateur football player
Walter Christensen (performer), who performed at Beaver Opera House and elsewhere in early 1900s